The 1958–59 Ice hockey Bundesliga season was the first season of the Ice hockey Bundesliga, the top level of ice hockey in Germany. Eight teams participated in the league, and EV Fussen won the championship.

Regular season

References

Eishockey-Bundesliga seasons 
Bund
Ger